Somali, was a frigate in the Free French Naval Forces during World War II and the French Navy post-war. The ship was originally built as USS Somali (DE-111), an American .

History

World War II
During World War II, Somali was transferred to the Free French Naval Forces under lend lease on 9 April 1944, and retained the name Somali.  Ownership of the vessel was transferred to France on 21 April 1952 under the Mutual Defense Assistance Program.

Somali would join TG 80.6 in Operation Anvil-Dragoon in August 1944.

First Indochina War
In August 1945, Somali arrived in French Indochina to help in the area.  Somali was stationed in Saigon and was sent to Nhabe, Soirap, Vaico and Bing Trung. On 25 January 1946, Somali participated in Operation Gaur.

Post War
In 1956 Somali was disarmed and used as an experimental ship with the hull number changed to A607.  On 1 January 1968 Somali was renamed Arago.

See also
List of escorteurs of the French Navy

References

External links
 

Cannon-class destroyer escorts of the United States Navy
Ships built in Wilmington, Delaware
1944 ships
Cannon-class destroyer escorts of the Free French Naval Forces
World War II frigates of France
Cold War frigates of France
Cannon-class destroyer escorts of the French Navy
Ships built by Dravo Corporation